Esperanto and Novial are two different constructed international auxiliary languages. Their main difference is that while Esperanto is a schematic language, with an unvarying grammar, Novial is a naturalistic language, whose grammar and vocabulary varies to try to retain a "natural" sound. Demographically, Esperanto has thousands of times more speakers than Novial.

Alphabet and pronunciation
Both Esperanto and Novial are written using versions of the Latin alphabet. The Esperanto alphabet has 28 letters: 22 without diacritics and 6 with diacritics unique to Esperanto: ĉ, ĝ, ĥ, ĵ, ŝ and ŭ. Novial uses the standard 26 letters of the Latin alphabet with no diacritics. 

In Esperanto one letter corresponds to one phoneme and one phoneme to one letter: there are no digraphs. Novial has 3 digraphs: ch, sh and qu; c and q are unique to these digraphs (except in foreign proper nouns) and permit no ambiguity; when s and h are separate phonemes this is indicated by separating with a hyphen: s-h.  Novial permits some 2-vowel combinations to be pronounced either as 2 separate vowels or as diphthongs; for example, au, eu and oi may be pronounced as a + w, e + w and o + y, respectively, and ie, io and ia as y + e, y + o and y + a, respectively.

In handwriting neither Esperanto nor Novial presents any problem. However, the diacritics of Esperanto require special methods for typing and printing. The original method was a set of digraphs now known as the "h-system", but with the rise of computer word processing a so-called "x-system" has become equally popular. These systems are described in the article Esperanto orthography. However, with the advent of Unicode, the need for such work-arounds has lessened.

Personal pronouns

The personal pronouns of Esperanto all end in i and some may be difficult to distinguish in a noisy environment (especially mi and ni). The personal pronouns of Novial use various vowels making them more distinct, although some differ only in the initial consonant (e.g. nus, vus and lus). A later form of nus – nos, more distinct from vus – has sometimes been used. Novial does not distinguish familiar and polite forms of “you” (e.g. French tu and vous). Novial's inventor argued that such a distinction has no place in a language intended solely for international use. The distinction is available in Esperanto  but is little used in practice. 

¹ ci and thou, while technically the familiar form of the word "you" in Esperanto and English, respectively, are almost never used. Results on Google have shown that ci  is used less than half of one percent of the amount vi is in Esperanto. Zamenhof himself did not include the pronoun in the first book on Esperanto and only later reluctantly; later he recommended against using ci on the grounds that different cultures have conflicting traditions regarding the use of the familiar and formal forms of "you", and that a universal language should avoid the problem by simply using the formal form in all situations. Novial uses only vu as the singular "you".

² tiu, "that person", is usually used in this circumstance, because many people find it unnatural to use "it" referring to humans.Apart from Ĝiism and Giism, Hiism and Riism as proposed reforms replace "Fundamento"-pronouns (ri instead of "li, ŝi, ĝi"; or "li" as utrum and hi instead of Fundamento "li"). Other proposals are variations of those four.

³iŝi, iĝi and by extension iri are proposed neologisms 

The Novial system displays a systematic correspondence between singular and corresponding plural forms (i.e. vu, vus; lo, los; la, las; lu, lus; le, les). Strictly speaking "we" is not the plural of "I", because "many I’s" is nonsensical. Jespersen suggested that nu, the singular of nus, could be used as a "royal we". The optional marking of sex in Novial, especially in the third person plural, permits greater flexibility than in Esperanto, at least in this case. Exactly the same system is applied to other pronouns and to nouns with natural sex differences.

Marking gender

The system of sex marking for Esperanto nouns is frequently criticised for being asymmetric and male biased. In contrast Novial has one symmetric, unbiased system for both nouns and pronouns which marks either male, female, epicene or inanimate.

Verbal systems

The grammars of Novial and Esperanto differ greatly in the way that the various tenses, moods and voices of verbs are expressed. Both use a combination of auxiliary verbs and verb endings. However, Novial uses many more auxiliary verbs and few endings, while Esperanto uses only one auxiliary verb and a greater number of verb endings.

In Novial all verb forms are independent of person (1st, 2nd or 3rd persons) and number (singular or plural). In Esperanto verb forms are independent of the person but compound tenses, with participles, require the participle (which is an adjective) to agree with the subject of the verb in number (singular or plural). 

The continuous tenses are less common in both Esperanto and Novial than in English.

In the following table endings are separated from stems by hyphens. Alternative forms with the same meaning are in brackets. In the Esperanto forms (j) indicates agreement when the subject of the verb is plural.

Active voice

Passive voice

The difference between the passive of becoming and the passive of being is not always immediately obvious to English speakers because their forms can often be the same. However, in English the passive of becoming is often expressed with the verb get in the sense of become as well as with the verb be.

Passive voice of becoming

Esperanto uses an appropriate form of the auxiliary verb esti (to be) followed by a passive participle (present, past or future according to sense). With many verbs Esperanto may, instead of the passive voice, use the suffix -iĝ- to form an intransitive verb of becoming, which is conjugated in the active voice (see table below).

Novial uses the auxiliary verb bli (to get, become, be from the equivalent auxiliary verb bli in Scandinavian languages) followed by the root form of the verb. The various tenses and moods are expressed regularly using the other auxiliary verbs ha, had, sal, saled and vud, the word order corresponding to the English.

Passive voice of being

The passive voice of being is generally expressed in English with an appropriate form of the verb to be followed by the past participle. It is formed in the same way in Esperanto and Novial. Note  that in contrast to the passive of becoming, in the Novial passive of being the auxiliary verb is followed by the past participle, which ends in -t.

Word formation 
In Esperanto, most words are created from a set number of roots, endings, and affixes. This allows for a comparatively low number of words to be extended to a described vocabulary, resulting in easy learning. However, some argue that results in heavy reliance on common affixes. For example, Esperanto notoriously relies heavily on the prefix mal- to form the opposite of an adjective or verb.  The equivalent prefix in Novial, des-, is used to a much lesser degree.

Language sample for comparison

Here is the Lord's Prayer in both languages:

See also
Comparison between Ido and Novial
Comparison between Esperanto and Ido
Comparison between Esperanto and Interlingua
 List of constructed languages

External links
Fundamento de Esperanto
  An International Language: Otto Jespersen's 1928 book which introduced Novial. Contains discussion of earlier auxiliary languages including Esperanto. 
 OTTO JESPERSEN His Work for an International Auxiliary Language By Henry Jacob, 1943, Comparative Texts comparing Esperanto, Novial, Ido, Occidental, Latino sine flexione, Esperanto and English.
  A PLANNED AUXILIARY LANGUAGE By Henry Jacob, 1947. A detailed comparative study of interlinguistics with full grammatical details of five systems of demonstrated usefulness, Esperanto, Ido, Occidental, Novial, and Latino sine flexione. 
 About Direct Derivation in International Languages By Friedrich Auerbach, 1930 (in Novial).
 Comparison of Esperanto and Novial at the Conlang Atlas of Language Structures.

Esperanto
Novial
Comparison of constructed languages